General Willem Frederik Pop (14 June 1858 – 24 July 1931) was a Dutch military officer who served as Commander-in-chief of the Armed forces between 1918 and 1919.

References

External links 
 

1858 births
1931 deaths
Royal Netherlands Army generals
Royal Netherlands Army officers
Chiefs of the Defence Staff (Netherlands)